Juan del Campo Hernández (born 28 June 1994 in Bilbao) is a Spanish World Cup alpine ski racer.

He competed at the 2018 Winter Olympics in Pyeongchang, South Korea, in the giant slalom and slalom, and in four World Championships.

World Cup results

Season standings

Results per discipline

World Championship results

Olympic results

References

External links

1994 births
Living people
Spanish male alpine skiers
Alpine skiers at the 2018 Winter Olympics
Olympic alpine skiers of Spain
Competitors at the 2015 Winter Universiade
21st-century Spanish people